Vesti FM is a radio station based in Russia and owned by VGTRK. It started broadcasting on February 5, 2008, at 6:00 am Moscow Time. The station is included in the first multiplex of digital television in Russia using DVB-T2 technology.

Vesti FM is described as a pro-Russian government broadcasting network.

History
The station began broadcasting on February 5, 2008, in Moscow on 97.6 MHz. At first the station broadcast only in Moscow and St. Petersburg, it now broadcasts to more than sixty regions of Russia.

At the end of the 1960s, the Soviet Union began building a powerful radio broadcasting station for propaganda to Western countries in Grigoriupol in the Maiac region of So called Transnistria. The "Moldovan Republic of Pridniestrov" (Transnistria) sold the facility to the Russian state media company RIA Novosti in 2007. The Russian Federation mandated the Vesti FM to also broadcast over Grigoriupol's powerful medium-wave transmitters. Vesti FM started broadcasting on 1413 kHz with 500 KW power from 2014, just before the start of the Ukraine crisis. The transmitter thus reached not only the entire Ukraine, but also a large part of Eastern and Western Europe without any problems. In the early morning of 26 April 2022 one of multiple antenna system of Vesti FM was blown up by unknown persons. However the MW station on 1413kHz is still working.

References

External links

Radio stations established in 2008
Radio stations in Russia
Russian-language radio stations
Mass media in Moscow